Robert Ortiz may refer to:
Robert Ortiz (gridiron football) (born 1983), former professional football player
 Robert Ortiz (born 1987), drummer for band Escape the Fate

See also
Roberto Ortiz (disambiguation)
Ortiz (surname)